Klövsjö is a locality situated in Berg Municipality, Jämtland County, Sweden with 291 inhabitants in 2010.

References

External links 
 Klövsjö - Official website

Populated places in Berg Municipality
Jämtland